"Head on Collision" is the second single from New Found Glory's third studio album, Sticks and Stones (2002). The single peaked at number 28 on the Billboard Modern Rock Tracks chart.

Track list
All songs written by New Found Glory.
 "Head on Collision"
 "Head on Collision" (Radio Session)
 "Something I Call Personality" (Radio Session)

Use in popular media
 Pop punk band All Time Low derived their name from lyrics in "Head on Collision".

Charts

References

2001 songs
2002 singles
New Found Glory songs
Music videos directed by The Malloys
Songs written by Chad Gilbert
Song recordings produced by Neal Avron